Wolfgang Brase (born 7 February 1939) is a retired German football player. He spent five seasons in the Bundesliga with Eintracht Braunschweig.

Honours
Eintracht Braunschweig
 Bundesliga: 1966–67

References

External links
 
 

1939 births
Living people
Sportspeople from Braunschweig
German footballers
Eintracht Braunschweig players
Bundesliga players
Association football defenders
Footballers from Lower Saxony